Pyapon Township is a township of Pyapon District in the Ayeyarwady Region of Myanmar. The principal town and administrative seat of the district is Pyapon. The southern portion of the township includes Ahmar Subtownship, an unofficial division used by the Township for statistical and administrative ease. 

Pyapon Township is located in south-central Ayeyarwaddy Region bordering the Andaman Sea to its south and west. Its northwestern boundary is concave and borders Bogale Township. To its northeast, it borders Kyaiklat Township and Dedaye Township all within Pyapon District. The township consists of two cities with a total of 23 wards between them as well as 52 village tracts and 212 villages.

Geography 
Pyapon Township is located on the furthest shores of the Irrawaddy Delta and is dominated by mangrove forests and farmlands. These forests contain Burmese grape trees, red mangroves, Indian magroves, sea holly mangroves, nipa palms, mangrove date palms and coastal bamboo plants. The township has  of protected lands. Inland Pyapon Township sees few settled forests, with non-agricultural lands are grassy areas used for grazing. The Mangrove areas are being degraded due to overexploitation of resources and habitat destruction for agricultural or fish-pond land use.

The township has several waterways, including the Pyapon River, Gonnyindan River and Bogale River among many smaller freshwater streams. sandbanks impede deep-ocean vessels from entering most waterways within the township. Pyapon Township is a hot and humid region with temperatures ranging, on average, between 18°C and 36°C. Between 2016 and 2019, the average year saw 121 days of rain with an average rainfall of 121.35 inches (308.22 cm) per year.

Demographics 

Pyapon Township is relatively rural with 83.2% of the population in 2019 living outside of Pyapon and Ahmar. The predominant religion is Buddhism, practiced by 95.5% of the population with the second largest religious group being Christians at 3.8%. The median age in the eastern portion of the town is 26.9 years with a mean household size of 4.4 persons. In the western Ahmar subtownship, the median age is 22.3 years with a mean household size of 4.5 persons.

Economy 
The economy of Pyapon Township is experience slow growth and development with the primary industries being agriculture and fishing. There is abundant navigable waterways and good overland transportation infrastructure. The major roadway connects Pyapon to Dala and Hlaingthaya, Yangon Region. The most common crop by far is rice with a very small amount of off-season winter crops. The township also sees a labour shortage and rising labour costs due to stresses from out-migration. Low income, lack of healthcare and lack of educational opportunities push rural residents in Ahmar Subtownship towards Pyapon or Hlaingthaya. The lack of off-season crops makes the already low agricultural income seasonal income, prompting many young adults to move to urban areas as they become jobless after the harvesting season. In recent years, the township has been experiencing increased salinity, particularly after Cyclone Nargis struck Pyapon and exacerbated coastal flooding. 85% of farms in the township faced salinity problems and decreasing farm yields. Traditional farming adaptations are longer effective, and technology is still limited within the agricultural sector.

There is also a dairy industry within the township alongside the raising of various farm animals. The township has over two thousand farm produce processors. The town of Pyapon serves as a center for collecting rice from the surrounding agricultural areas, and is home to a diesel-run power plant, using equipment by the German firm Siemens.

The townships many freshwater fisheries, mostly for shrimp. The majority of the fish produce is caught freshwater fish. The fish fauna is diverse and abundant within the township's freshwater, brackish and marine ecosystems. The most common fish caught are in the order Perciformes.

References 

Townships of Ayeyarwady Region